The Hard Lessons are a rock band from Detroit, Michigan, known for their high-energy live appearances and innovative sound.  The band has toured extensively in the United States and Europe. They were originally formed at Michigan State University in East Lansing.

The band consists of married couple Augie Visocchi (Vocals, Electric & Acoustic Guitars, Fuzz Bass, Mandolin, Piano, Kazoo, Percussion, and Vacuum) and Korin "Ko Ko" Louise Visocchi (Vocals, Piano, Synthesizers, Hammond Organ Bass,
Autoharp, Glockenspiel, Cornet, Percussion). Mark Dawson is their current live drummer.

They were named 2006 Artists of the Year by Real Detroit Weekly. Their song "Wedding Ring" was featured in an episode of Grey's Anatomy. Their song "Wicked Man" was featured in an episode of Friday Night Lights. Their song "See and Be Scene" was featured in a 2010 Chevrolet commercial.

Studio Discography

References

External links 
 The Hard Lessons Official website
 The Hard Lessons on Myspace
 The Hard Lessons Facebook Fans
 "Wedding Ring" as heard on Grey's Anatomy
 Hard Lessons Tour Journal
 

Musical groups from Detroit
Musical groups established in 2003
American musical trios
2003 establishments in Michigan